Lamphey Bishop's Palace or Lamphey Palace (alternatively Lamphey Court) is a ruined medieval building complex in Lamphey, Pembrokeshire. It is a scheduled ancient monument and a Grade I Listed building. The grounds of the palace are designated, jointly with the park of Lamphey Court, as Grade II* on the Cadw/ICOMOS Register of Parks and Gardens of Special Historic Interest in Wales.

History
Whilst early thirteenth-century fragments from the old hall still exist, the palace, including the  great hall, was largely constructed under Bishop Henry de Gower, Bishop of St David's (1328–1347) and was used by high-ranking clergy. The palace was built in three stages and originally had over 20 rooms and featured fishponds, orchards, fruit and herb gardens and areas of parkland with grazing deer.

The palace was surrendered to the crown in 1546 during the reign Henry VIII and granted to Richard Devereux and subsequently the Earls of Essex. Walter Devereux, 1st Earl of Essex lived in the palace as a child. The palace was sold to the Owens of Orielton in 1683, possibly due to damage in the English Civil War. The buildings were possibly used for farm purposes in this era.

The palace ruins are listed as a scheduled ancient monument and a Grade I Listed building. The grounds of the palace are designated, jointly with the park of Lamphey Court, as Grade II* on the Cadw/ICOMOS Register of Parks and Gardens of Special Historic Interest in Wales.

Gallery

See also
St Davids Bishops Palace

References

Episcopal palaces in Wales
Grade I listed buildings in Pembrokeshire
Scheduled monuments in Pembrokeshire
Registered historic parks and gardens in Pembrokeshire